The 1867 City of Christchurch by-election was a by-election held on 13 February 1867 during the 4th New Zealand Parliament in the Christchurch electorate of .

The by-election was caused by the resignation of the incumbent MP James FitzGerald on 3 January 1867.

The by-election was won by William Travers.

Results

Notes

Christchurch
1867 elections in New Zealand
Politics of Christchurch